The black-goggled tanager (Trichothraupis melanops) is a species of bird in the family, Thraupidae. It is the only member of the genus  Trichothraupis. It is found at low levels in forest and woodland in a large part of eastern and southern Brazil, eastern Paraguay and far north-eastern Argentina, with a disjunct population along the East Andean slope in Peru, Bolivia and far north-western Argentina. While generally common and widespread, and consequently considered to be of least concern by BirdLife International and IUCN, the population associated with the Andes is relatively local and uncommon.

The underparts are tawny, the back and head are dull brownish-olive, and the tail and wings are contrastingly black (the latter with a white speculum that is difficult to see when perched, but conspicuous in flight). The male has a yellow crown patch and a large black patch around the eyes (the black "goggles" for which the species is named).

Taxonomy
The black-goggled tanager was formally described in 1818 by the French ornithologist Louis Jean Pierre Vieillot under the binomial name Muscicapa melanops. Vieillot based his description on the Lindo pardo copete amarillo that had been described by the Spanish naturalist Félix de Azara in 1802 based on a specimen collected in Paraguay. The black-goggled tanager is now the only species placed in the genus Trichothraupis that was introduced by the German ornithologist Jean Cabanis in 1851. The genus name Trichothraupis combines the Ancient Greek thrix meaning "hair" with the genus name Thraupis. The specific epithet combines the Ancient Greek melas meaning "black" with ōps meaning "face". The black-goggled tanager is monotypic: no subspecies are recognised.

Within the Thraupidae, the black-goggled tanager is a member of the subfamily Tachyphoninae and is the sister species to the grey-headed tanager in the monospecific genus Eucometis.

References

External links
 Xeno-canto: audio recordings of the black-goggled tanager

black-goggled tanager
Birds of the Yungas
Birds of Brazil
Birds of Paraguay
black-goggled tanager
Taxa named by Louis Jean Pierre Vieillot